The Tamperer featuring Maya was an Italian dance music group consisting of Italian record producers Mario Fargetta and Alex Farolfi, and American singer Maya Days. Later, Giuliano Saglia and GianLuca Mensi would join the project. It achieved European success in 1998 with the chart-topping single "Feel It".

Overview 
In 1998, the group became famous for its debut single, "Feel It", which peaked at No. 1 in both Ireland and the United Kingdom in May of that year and was taken from the album Fabulous. This song was written by the American team of Steve Gittelman and Jim Dyke, and relied heavily on a sample of the Jacksons hit "Can You Feel It".

The album spawned two more singles, "If You Buy This Record (Your Life Will Be Better)" (based on a sample from Madonna's "Material Girl"), and the Italy-only release "Step Out". The group returned in early 2000 to release its next (and final) single, "Hammer to the Heart" (based on ABBA's "Gimme! Gimme! Gimme! (A Man After Midnight)"). This became a success also, where it became the group's third top-ten hit in the UK.

The producers also used the Tamperer alias to produce and remix other artists, such as Crystal Waters.

Discography

Albums

Singles

References

External links 
 
 
 

Italian house music groups
Italian Eurodance groups
Jive Records artists
Musical groups from Milan
Musical groups established in 1998
Musical groups disestablished in 2000